Khanlar (Goygol) is a city and municipality and the capital of the Goygol Rayon in Azerbaijan.

Khanlar may also refer to:

People
 Khanlar Hajiyev (born 1956), Azerbaijani judge
 Khanlar Maharramov (1950–1998), Azerbaijani ashiq 
 Khanlar Mirza (died 1862), Persian prince of the Qajar dynasty
 Khanlar Safaraliyev (c.1878–1907), Azerbaijani oil field worker and labor organizer

Places
 Bibiheybət, a municipality in Baku, Azerbaijan, formerly named "Khanlar"
 Xanlar, Goygol, a village in the Goygol District in Azerbaijan  
 Khanlar, Iran, a village in Khodabandeh County, Zanjan Province, Iran
 Khanlar, West Azerbaijan, a village in Oshnavieh County, West Azerbaijan Province, Iran
 Khanlar Rayon (Goygol District), a district in Azerbaijan

See also